Markovič is a Czech, Slovak, and Slovenian surname derived from the given name Marek/Mark. Notable people with the surname include:
 (1888-1944)
Jakub Markovič 
Jaroslav Markovič 
Mina Markovič
 (1866-1929), Slovenian-Austrian painter

See also
Markowicz
Markowitz (disambiguation)
Markiewicz
Marković
Markovics
Markovits
Markov

Czech-language surnames
Slovak-language surnames
Patronymic surnames